Epie-Atissa may refer to:
the Epie-Atissa people
the Epie-Atissa language